Gro Brundtland (born Gro Harlem, 20 April 1939) is a Norwegian politician (Arbeiderpartiet), who served three terms as the 29th Prime Minister of Norway (1981, 1986–1989, and 1990–1996) and as the director-general of the World Health Organization from 1998 to 2003. She is also known for having chaired the Brundtland Commission which presented the Brundtland Report on sustainable development.
Educated as a physician, Brundtland joined the Labour Party and entered the government in 1974 as Minister of the Environment. She became the first female Prime Minister of Norway on 4 February 1981, but left office on 14 October 1981; she returned as Prime Minister on 9 May 1986 and served until 16 October 1989. She finally returned for her third term on 3 November 1990. From 1981 to 1992 she was leader of the Labour Party. After her surprise resignation as Prime Minister in 1996, she became an international leader in sustainable development and public health, and served as Director-General of the World Health Organization and as UN Special Envoy on Climate Change from 2007 to 2010. She is also deputy chair of The Elders and a former vice-president of Socialist International.

Brundtland belonged to the moderate wing of her party and supported Norwegian membership in the European Union during the 1994 referendum. As Prime Minister Brundtland became widely known as the "mother of the nation." Brundtland received the 1994 Charlemagne Prize, and has received many other awards and recognitions.

Early life
Brundtland was born in Oslo in 1939, the daughter of physician and politician Gudmund Harlem and Inga Margareta Elisabet Brynolf (1918–2005). She has a younger brother, Lars and a younger sister, Hanne.

In 1963, Brundtland graduated with a medical degree, a cand.med. from the University of Oslo. She took her master's degree at Harvard University in 1965, as a Master of Public Health.

From 1966 to 1969, she worked as a physician at the Directorate of Health (Helsedirektoratet), and from 1969 she worked as a doctor in Oslo's public school health service.

Political career
She was Norwegian Minister for Environmental Affairs from 1974 to 1979.

Prime Minister of Norway
Brundtland became Norway's first female Prime Minister in 1981. She served as Prime Minister from February to October.

Brundtland became Norwegian Prime Minister for two further, and more durable, terms. The second ministry was from 9 May 1986 until 16 October 1989 and this cabinet became known worldwide for its high proportion of female ministers: nearly half, or eight of the total eighteen ministers, were female. The third ministry was from 3 November 1990 to 25 October 1996.

Brundtland became leader of the Labour Party in 1981 and held the office until resigning in 1992, during her third term as Prime Minister. In 1996, she resigned as Prime Minister and retired completely from Norwegian politics. Her successor as both Labour Party leader in 1992 and as Prime Minister in 1996 was Thorbjørn Jagland.

International career
In 1983, Brundtland was invited by then United Nations Secretary-General Javier Pérez de Cuéllar to establish and chair the World Commission on Environment and Development (WCED), widely referred to as the Brundtland Commission. She developed the broad political concept of sustainable development in the course of extensive public hearings, that were distinguished by their inclusiveness. The commission, which published its report, Our Common Future, in April 1987, provided the momentum for the 1992 Earth Summit/UNCED, which was headed by Maurice Strong, who had been a prominent member of the commission. The Brundtland Commission also provided momentum for Agenda 21.

During her third ministry, the Norwegian government in 1993 took the initiative to sponsor secret peace talks between the Government of Israel led by Yitzchak Rabin – like Brundtland, leader of a Labour Party – and the PLO led by Yasser Arafat. This culminated with the signing of the Oslo Accords. For several years afterwards Norway continued to have a high-profile involvement in promoting Israeli-Palestinian peace, though increasingly displaced by the United States from its role as the mediator.

After the end of her term as PM, Brundtland was then elected Director-General of the World Health Organization in May 1998. In this capacity, Brundtland adopted a far-reaching approach to public health, establishing a Commission on Macroeconomics and Health, chaired by Jeffrey Sachs, and addressing violence as a major public health issue. Brundtland spearheaded the movement, now worldwide, to achieve the abolition of cigarette smoking by education, persuasion, and increased taxation. Under her leadership, the World Health Organization was one of the first major employers to make quitting smoking a condition of employment.
Under Brundtland's leadership, the World Health Organization was criticized for increased drug-company influence on the agency.

Brundtland was recognized in 2003 by Scientific American as their 'Policy Leader of the Year' for coordinating a rapid worldwide response to stem outbreaks of SARS. Brundtland was succeeded on 21 July 2003 by Jong-Wook Lee. In 1994, Brundtland was awarded the Charlemagne Prize of the city of Aachen.

In 2006 Brundtland was a member of the Panel of Eminent Persons who reviewed the work of the United Nations Conference on Trade and Development (UNCTAD). In May 2007, UN Secretary-General Ban Ki-moon named Brundtland, as well as Ricardo Lagos (the former president of Chile), and Han Seung-soo (the former foreign minister of South Korea), to serve as UN Special Envoys for Climate Change.

Brundtland's hallmark political activities have been chronicled by her husband, in his two bestsellers, Married to Gro and Still married to Gro.

In 2007, Brundtland was working for Pepsi as a consultant.

Brundtland is a member of the Council of Women World Leaders, an international network of current and former women presidents and prime ministers whose mission is to mobilize collective action on issues of critical importance to women and equitable development.

Brundtland is also a member of the Club of Madrid, an independent organization of former leaders of democratic states, which works to strengthen democratic governance and leadership.

Brundtland is a founding member of The Elders, a group of world leaders originally convened by Nelson Mandela, Graça Machel and Desmond Tutu in order to tackle some of the world's toughest problems. Mandela announced the launch of the group on 18 July 2007 in Johannesburg, South Africa. Brundtland has been active in The Elders' work, participating in a broad range of the group's initiatives. She has travelled with Elders delegations to Cyprus, the Korean Peninsula, Ethiopia, India and the Middle East. Brundtland has also been involved in The Elders' initiative on child marriage, including the founding of Girls Not Brides: The Global Partnership to End Child Marriage. She was appointed Deputy Chair of the group in 2013 and was succeeded in this role by Ban Ki-moon and Graça Machel in 2018.

Brundtland attended the Bilderberg meetings in 1982 and 1983. Her husband attended in 1991.

In 2019, Brundtland served as co-chair with the WHO Global Preparedness Monitoring Board.

Assassination attempt
Brundtland narrowly escaped assassination by Anders Behring Breivik on 22 July 2011. She had been on the island of Utøya hours before the massacre there to give a speech to the AUF camp; Breivik stated that he originally intended Brundtland to be the main target of the attack (along with Eskil Pedersen and Jonas Gahr Støre), but he had been delayed while travelling from Oslo. Breivik arrived on Utøya about two hours after Brundtland had left.

During his trial in 2012, Breivik revealed detailed assassination plans for Brundtland. He told the court that he had planned to handcuff her and then record himself reading out a prepared text detailing her "crimes", before decapitating her on camera using a bayonet and uploading the footage to the internet. Breivik said that while Brundtland had been his main target, he had still planned to massacre everyone else on the island.

Personal life
She married Arne Olav Brundtland on 9 December 1960. They had four children; one is now deceased. They own a house in the south of France.

Health issues
Brundtland was operated on for uterine cancer in 2002 at Oslo University Hospital, Ullevål. In 2008 it became known that during 2007 she had received two treatments at Ullevål, paid for by Norwegian public expenditures. Since she had previously notified the Norwegian authorities that she had changed residence to France, she was no longer entitled to Norwegian social security benefits. Following media attention surrounding the matter, Brundtland decided to change residence once more, back to Norway, and she also announced that she would be paying for the treatments herself. Brundtland has claimed to suffer from electrical sensitivity which causes headaches when someone uses a mobile phone near her.

Honours

Brundtland has received many awards and honours, including
Indira Gandhi Prize (1988)
Charlemagne Prize (1994)
Member of the American Philosophical Society (2002)
Thomas Jefferson Foundation Medal in Architecture (2008)
Prize International Catalonia (2013) with Malala Yousafzai
Tang Prize in Sustainable Development (2014)
Honorary member of the Norwegian Association for Women's Rights (2016)
Member of the Norwegian Academy of Science and Letters
The National German Sustainability Award
Honorary Member of the Moscow Society of Naturalists
Rudyard n. Propst Award from Clubhouse International

See also
Odvar Nordli
Thorbjørn Jagland

References

Further reading
 Wilsford, David, ed. Political leaders of contemporary Western Europe: a biographical dictionary (Greenwood, 1995) pp 49–56.

Brundtland, Gro Harlem (2002) "Madam Prime Minister: A Life in Power and Politics". New York: Farrar, Straus and Giroux, primary source

External links

 
 
Appearances on C-SPAN

|-

|-

|-

|-

|-

1939 births
20th-century Norwegian politicians
20th-century Norwegian women politicians
Fellows of the Academy of Medical Sciences (United Kingdom)
Norwegian women diplomats
Harvard School of Public Health alumni
Leaders of the Labour Party (Norway)
Living people
Members of the Norwegian Academy of Science and Letters
Members of the Storting
Ministers of Climate and the Environment of Norway
Norwegian humanists
Norwegian people of Swedish descent
Norwegian women physicians
Politicians from Oslo
Norwegian public health doctors
Prime Ministers of Norway
University of Oslo alumni
World Health Organization officials
Women prime ministers
Women government ministers of Norway
Honorary Fellows of the London School of Economics
Women members of the Storting
Norwegian officials of the United Nations
Norwegian Association for Women's Rights people
Recipients of the Four Freedoms Award
United Nations Foundation
Members of the American Philosophical Society
Special Envoys of the Secretary-General of the United Nations
Members of the National Academy of Medicine
Women public health doctors